Tórtola de Henares is a municipality located in the province of Guadalajara, Castile-La Mancha, Spain. The municipality covers an area of 26.85 km2. It lies at 736 metres above sea level. , it has a population of 1,012.

References 

Municipalities in the Province of Guadalajara